The men's 800 metres middle distance event at the 1960 Olympic Games took place between August 31 and September 2. Fifty-one athletes from 35 nations competed. The maximum number of athletes per nation had been set at 3 since the 1930 Olympic Congress. 

All three nations earning medals in 1960 were new to the podium in the event. The event was won by Peter Snell of New Zealand, the nation's first medal in the men's 800 metres. Snell would defend his title in 1964. Roger Moens took silver, earning Belgium's first medal. George Kerr took bronze for the British West Indies, one of only two medals that nation earned in its brief Olympic history (the 4 × 400 metres relay bronze a few days later would be the other). After four straight gold medals from 1936 to 1956, the United States failed to even make the final.

Summary

Only six men were seeded into the final. From the gun Christian Wägli led the pack of five runners off the turn, with only Manfred Matuschewski already beaten. Falling in the back of the pack was Peter Snell from lane 6, the far outside. Wägli held the lead down the final backstretch and through the final turn, with Roger Moens moving in behind him ready to pounce out of a still tight pack. Snell was still at the back, boxed in with George Kerr to his outside. Coming off the turn, Moens pounced, passing Wägli in lane 2 with clear sailing to victory.  But Moens' move broke up the pack, it was a free-for-all sprint to the finish. With Wägli struggling on the rail, Snell had a path down lane 1. On the outside Kerr passed Paul Schmidt and was sprinting in lane 3. A surprised Moens looked to his inside to see who the competitor was who was passing him.  It was Snell with more power. Moens tried to accelerate again but Snell's strength was too much.  Looking at Snell again he leaned for the line but too little too late to catch Snell.

Background

This was the 14th appearance of the event, which is one of 12 athletics events to have been held at every Summer Olympics. None of the finalists from 1956 returned. Roger Moens of Belgium was the favorite; he had set the world record in 1955 but missed the 1956 Games due to injury. George Kerr of Jamaica (then competing as part of the British West Indies) was "expected to be his biggest challenger".

Guyana, Liechtenstein, Morocco, Rhodesia, and Tunisia appeared in the event for the first time; the British West Indies federation competed for the only Games of its existence, though members Jamaica and Trinidad and Tobago had each previously had competitors in the 800 metres. Great Britain and the United States each made their 13th appearance, tied for the most among all nations.

Competition format

For the first time, the 800 metres was run over four rounds. The final, which had been 9 men from 1920 to 1952 but was reduced to 8 in 1956, was further reduced to only 6 men in 1960. There were nine first-round heats, each with between 6 and 8 athletes (before withdrawals); the top three runners in each heat advanced to the quarterfinals. There were four quarterfinals, each with 6 or 7 athletes (again, before withdrawals); the top three in each heat advanced to the semifinals. There were two semifinals with 6 athletes each; the top three runners in each semifinal advanced to the six-man final.

Records

These were the standing world and Olympic records (in minutes) prior to the 1948 Summer Olympics.

Six of the 12 semifinalists came in under the Olympic record time, but George Kerr was the first and fastest in that round, setting the record at 1:47.26. That lasted only until the final, however, as all three medalists beat the time. Peter Snell's gold-winning 1:46.48 stood as the new Olympic record after the event.

Schedule

For the first time since 1920, two rounds (round 1 and the quarterfinals) were held on the same day.

All times are Central European Time (UTC+1)

Results

Heats

The fastest three runners in each of the nine heats advanced to the quarterfinal round.

Heat 1

Lambrechts ran in heat 2. Parsch ran in heat 7.

Heat 2

Heat 3

Heat 4

Heat 5

Heat 6

Heat 7

Heat 8

Heat 9

Quarterfinals

The fastest three runners in each of the four heats advanced to the semifinal round.

Quarterfinal 1

Quarterfinal 2

Quarterfinal 3

Quarterfinal 4

Semifinals

The fastest three runners in each of the two heats advanced to the final round.

Semifinal 1

Semifinal 2

Final

References

M
800 metres at the Olympics
Men's events at the 1960 Summer Olympics